Aerobactin is a bacterial iron chelating agent (siderophore) found in E. coli. It is a virulence factor enabling E. coli to sequester iron in iron-poor environments such as the urinary tract.

Aerobactin is biosynthesized by the oxidation of lysine, catalyzed by the enzyme aerobactin synthase, which is then coupled to citric acid. The gene for this enzyme is found in the aerobactin operon, which is roughly 8 kilobases long and contains 5 or more genes in total.

Yersinia pestis contains genes relating to aerobactin, but they have been inactivated by a frameshift mutation, thus Y. pestis is no longer able to synthesize aerobactin.

Other homologs 
 Rhizobactin from Sinorhizobium
 Alcaligin from Bordetella

References 

Escherichia coli
Siderophores
Hydroxamic acids
Tricarboxylic acids